Žarko Trifunović (born 20 September 1989) is a Serbian football goalkeeper.

References

External links
 
 Žarko Trifunović stats at utakmica.rs 
 

1989 births
Living people
Sportspeople from Kragujevac
Association football goalkeepers
Serbian footballers
FK Radnički 1923 players
FK Dinamo Vranje players
FK Karađorđe Topola players
FK Smederevo players
Serbian First League players
Serbian SuperLiga players